Traditional leadership of Namibia is a governing structure in Namibia based on the ethnicity of the indigenous people of the territory. Acceptance of a traditional authority is vested in the Government of Namibia. There are 51 recognised traditional authorities and a further 40 pending applications.

Traditional authorities cover the entire Namibian territory. Leaders and their administrative staff are not paid by the state. Instead the traditional group's members are expected to sustain their leadership. Government did, however, give one car each to the recognised authorities, and awards allowances for fuel and administrative work. The parallel existence of traditional authorities and the Namibian government in Namibia is controversial. The traditional rulers and leaders are represented through the Council of Traditional Leaders, established by Act 13 of 1997 (GG 1706) and amended by Act 31 of 2000 (GG 2462).

Functions
Traditional leaders are entrusted with the allocation of communal land and the formulation of the traditional group's customary laws.

They also take over judicial work through traditional courts, offering a way to access compensation through civil law that does not require fees or lawyers. Crime in Namibia is treated by the classical courts solely as a criminal procedure, and ends in punishment of the offender; To seek material compensation a civil case has to be opened after the criminal verdict. Traditional fines are thus, in the words of justice minister Yvonne Dausab, meant "to wipe off tears", and not to replace criminal proceedings.

Typical punishments are in money or in livestock. For instance, the traditional courts of the Ovambo people in Namibia's north fine ten cows or 15,000N$ for murder, two cows or 3,000N$ for impregnating a child, and up to six cows for theft, depending on severity. The traditional court of the Oorlam people at Vaalgras in Namibia's south, where there are few communal cattle farmers, fines three goats for theft.

Recognised traditional authorities

References

Ethnic groups in Namibia
Namibian culture
History of Namibia
Politics of Namibia
Namibia